St Laurence's Church, also known as St Laurence-in-Thanet, is a Church of England parish church in Ramsgate, Thanet, Kent.

History
The church, founded in 1062, is a grade I listed building, and is the oldest church in Ramsgate. It was an abbey church until 1275, when it became a parish church. The building was enlarged in the 12th and 13th centuries, including a chancel and side aisles being implemented. 

A lightning strike in 1439 resulted in the church being rebuilt, with the tower being raised to its present height.

As Ramsgate grew, the town developed its own church: St Laurence became a separate parish in 1826.

Churchyard

St Laurence has a large churchyard covering three and a half acres. It contains over 1400 graves, the earliest of which is dated to 1656.

Notable burials
 D'Este Mausoleum
 John Murray, 4th Earl of Dunmore (1732–1809)
 Lady Augusta Murray (1761-1830)
 Thomas Wilde, 1st Baron Truro  (1782–1855)
 Augusta Emma d'Este (1801–1866)

 Admiral William Fox (c1733-1810) 
 Sir William Garrow (1760–1840)
 John Collis Browne (1819–1884)

References

External links
 A Church Near You entry
 Parish website

Church of England church buildings in Kent
Grade I listed churches in Kent
Saint Laurence
11th-century church buildings in England
Diocese of Canterbury